Palisades is a village in Randall County, Texas, United States. The population was 325 at the 2010 census. It is part of the Amarillo, Texas Metropolitan Statistical Area.

Geography

Palisades is located at  (35.060378, –101.799369).

Demographics

2020 census

As of the 2020 United States census, there were 268 people, 145 households, and 87 families residing in the village.

2000 census
As of the census of 2000, there were 352 people, 144 households, and 98 families residing in the village. The population density was 610.6 people per square mile (234.3/km2). There were 157 housing units at an average density of 272.3/sq mi (104.5/km2). The racial makeup of the village was 95.74% White, 2.27% Native American, 1.14% from other races, and 0.85% from two or more races. Hispanic or Latino of any race were 3.12% of the population.

There were 144 households, out of which 35.4% had children under the age of 18 living with them, 55.6% were married couples living together, 8.3% had a female householder with no husband present, and 31.9% were non-families. 29.2% of all households were made up of individuals, and 7.6% had someone living alone who was 65 years of age or older. The average household size was 2.44 and the average family size was 2.95.

In the village, the age distribution of the population shows 27.0% under the age of 18, 8.0% from 18 to 24, 27.8% from 25 to 44, 25.3% from 45 to 64, and 11.9% who were 65 years of age or older. The median age was 39 years. For every 100 females, there were 116.0 males. For every 100 females age 18 and over, there were 117.8 males.

The median income for a household in the village was $32,188, and the median income for a family was $38,125. Males had a median income of $33,125 versus $17,083 for females. The per capita income for the village was $17,011. About 8.6% of families and 9.2% of the population were below the poverty line, including 11.2% of those under age 18 and 4.4% of those age 65 or over.

References

Villages in Randall County, Texas
Villages in Texas
Villages in Amarillo metropolitan area